Sabr ad-Din III (died 1422 or 1423) was a Sultan of Adal and the oldest son of Sa'ad ad-Din II. Sabr ad-Din returned to the Horn of Africa from Yemen to reclaim his father's realm. He defeated the Ethiopians and proclaimed himself "King of Adal". He subsequently became the first ruler and founder of the new Adal dynasty.

Reign

He returned from Arabia with ten horsemen, as well as military supplies provided by his family's patron Nasir Ahmad. Sabr ad-Din and his brothers made their way to a place called Sayara, where they were joined by a number of their fathers former followers. Even though they were outnumbered by the soldiers of the Christian state, they fought several successful battles. Defeating them in Zikr Amhara (Memory of the Amhara), also at the district of Serjan. Scattering their enemies, they burnt houses and churches and seized much booty in gold and other valuables.

Such destruction and opposition on the eastern borders angered the Christian rulers of the empire. An unnamed commander with ten chiefs, each in charge of 20,000 men, moved into area for a year hoping to restore the lost "Amhara rule". This caused Sabr Ad-din and his followers to flee and endure hunger, thirst and other deprivations.

The Muslims forces later regained their strength. Sabr ad-Din was able to send his brother Muhammad with Harb Jaush, a defector from the Christian side, to attack the imperial forces. The Emperor's commander and many other Christian leaders fell in battle and their soldiers were killed, except for a few of them who managed to escape. Sabr ad-Din seized a considerable amount of booty, then subsequently ruled the district for some time. He later proceeded towards the Emperor's headquarters, where a fierce battle was fought in which many Christian nobles fell, after which Sabr ad-Din put their headquarters up in flames.

Victorious the King then returned to his capital, but gave the order to his many followers to continue and extend the war. He entrusted his brother Muhammad with the task of capturing a fort at Barut and then instructed one of his commanders, Omar to raid the land of Jab. This was so well defended by the imperial forces as by their sheer number as Maqrizi relates as "numerous as locusts", Omar's men were all killed by spears. Sabr Ad-Din was almost captured but escaped because of the speed of his horse.

Sabr-ad-Din soon died of natural death, in 1422-3

See also
Sabr ad-Din I
Walashma dynasty

Notes

Sultans of the Adal Sultanate
15th-century monarchs in Africa
15th-century Somalian people
Somalian Muslims
Year of birth missing
Year of death missing